Statistics of the Chinese Taipei National Football League for the 2000–01 season.

Overview
It was contested by 7 teams, and Taipower won the championship.

League standings

Notes

References
Chinese Taipei - List of final tables (RSSSF)

Chinese Taipei National Football League seasons
Chinese Taipei
1
1